The Doccia porcelain manufactory, at Doccia, a frazione of Sesto Fiorentino, near Florence, was in theory founded in 1735 by marchese Carlo Ginori near his villa, though it does not appear to have produced wares for sale until 1746.  It has remained the most important Italian porcelain factory ever since.

In its first decades it was unusual in producing, alongside the usual tablewares and vases, etc, porcelain versions of statuettes and small sculptures, intended as bronzes, by Florentine sculptors of several decades earlier.  After the death of its founder in 1757 the factory concentrated on producing more conventional wares, often borrowing styles from larger factories in Germany and France.

Now known as Richard-Ginori, following its merger with Società Richard of Milan, by 2013 it was in bankruptcy and was acquired by Gucci.  The Museo Richard Ginori della Manifattura di Doccia, a museum nearby dedicated to the factory and its history, is closed to visitors as of 2019.

History
Its early wares were of a soft-paste porcelain, as were most European porcelains with some exceptions, notably Meissen, where deposits of kaolin had been discovered and hard-paste porcelain was made. Vezzi porcelain in Venice had also made hard-paste with Saxon kaolin, but had closed in 1727.  By around 1750 Doccia were making hard-paste.

Ginori established the kilns at the foot of forested Monte Morello, whose timber fuelled them, and initiated experiments with local potting clays. He engaged J.K.W. Anreiter from Vienna to head the painting workshop and in 1737 a local sculptor, Gaspero Bruschi, as the chief modeller. Bruschi stayed at the factory until his death in 1780.   Production began in 1737. By 1740 Ginori was confident enough of his products to send samples to Vienna and get a privilege for porcelain manufacture in the Austrian-ruled Grand Duchy of Tuscany, giving him the security of a monopoly.

Ginori obtained wax models and casts from the heirs of major Florentine baroque sculptors Giovanni Battista Foggini and Massimiliano Soldani that were intended for casting in bronze, and produced boldly-scaled porcelain figure groups “of a grandeur which makes the figures of most other C18 factories look petite and trifling,” John Fleming and Hugh Honour have observed. Some statuettes of famous Roman sculptures were also produced. Over 150 sculptural pieces were produced.

The early Doccia paste is gritty in texture and slightly grayish; its glaze less glossy than most contemporaneous European porcelains. Innovative decorating techniques from the 1740s were transfer-printing and the stampino, or stenciled decor, usually of blue on the white ground; since these could be employed by inexperienced workers, decorated porcelain was brought within reach of the middle classes, and porcelain rapidly replaced traditional maiolica in common use.

Ginori's manufacture was continued without a break by his three sons, who introduced a new, whiter body, with tin oxide added to the glaze for increased whiteness, but were less successful in adapting neoclassical forms to the wares. With the revival of rococo styles in the nineteenth century, the Doccia manufactory reverted to its eighteenth-century models.

Later history
 
The manufacture remained in the hands of the Ginori heirs until 1896, when it was incorporated with the Società Ceramica Richard of Milan, a larger manufacturer of ceramics, as Richard-Ginori.<ref>[http://www.pozzi-ginori.com/storia-2/mc_4.swf Over Two and a Half centuries of History from Pozzi-Ginori Archives"] </ref> Gio Ponti served as artistic director of the manufacture from 1923 to 1930, producing many designs in the Art Deco manner, and was succeeded by Giovanni Gariboldi, 1930-1970. In 1950 the factory moved to a new building two miles away from the old site.

The firm was declared bankrupt in January 2013. A deadline of May 2013 was set by the court to find a new buyer, hopefully one which would continue to maintain historic quality standards, operate the existing plant, employ its local workforce. Lenox, the American firm, and Apulum, a Romanian china manufacturer, showed interest and made joint bids. That effort proved unsuccessful and the firm was again put up for sale and in April, 2013 acquired by Gucci for €13 million, $16.8 million. Gucci's plans were to improve the factory in Florence, concentrate on high-end products, and sell products under its name in luxury markets such as China.

Museum
The Museo Richard Ginori della Manifattura di Doccia was opened in 1965 in a new purpose-built building near the factory.  The collection had previously been housed in the eighteenth-century factory building.  The museum and its collection was not included in the sale of the company to Gucci in 2013, and closed to visitors in 2014.  In 2017 the Italian government agreed to buy it, with the sale completed in 2018. By then the building and parts of the collection (especially the unique collection of wax models) had suffered from lack of maintenance, and as of 2019 the museum remains closed to the public while restoration and conservation work continues.

Notes

References

Battie, David, ed., Sotheby's Concise Encyclopedia of Porcelain, 1990, Conran Octopus, 
Hess, Catherine, Italian Ceramics: Catalogue of the J. Paul Getty Museum Collections, 2003, Getty Publications, 9780892366705, google books
Le Corbeiller, Clare, Eighteenth-century Italian Porcelain, 1985, Metropolitan Museum of Art, 9780870994210, fully online
Lane, Arthur, Italian Porcelain 1954.
Ginori-Lisci, La porcellana di Doccia (Milan) 1963.
Liverani, G. Il museo delle porcellane di Doccia'' 1967.

External links
Olivia Rucellai, “Museo Richard-Ginori”
Richard Ginori 1735 Italy, Official web site

Ceramics manufacturers of Italy
Companies based in Tuscany
Gucci
Porcelain